Luc or LUC may refer to:

Places
 Luc, Hautes-Pyrénées, France, a commune
 Luc, Lozère, France, a commune
 Le Luc, France, a commune
 Luč, Baranja, Croatia, a settlement

People and fictional characters
 Luc (given name)
 Luc (surname)

Academia
 Leiden University College The Hague, a liberal arts & sciences honours college in the Netherlands
 Limburgs Universitair Centrum, now University of Hasselt, Belgium
 Loyola University Chicago

Other uses
 Land-use change
 LUC, cryptosystem based on Lucas sequences

See also 
 Château de Luc, a French castle-ruin in the town of Luc in the Lozère département
 Luc-en-Diois, France, a commune
 Luc-la-Primaube, France, a commune
 Luc-sur-Mer, France, a commune
 Saint-Luc (disambiguation)
 Luk (disambiguation)